Charadupinnikali (Malayalam: ചരടുപിന്നിക്കളി - literally 'string dance') or Urikkali is a dance form practiced in South Kerala and by ex-pat communities in other countries. The play is performed holding the cords hung at the place of performance. At the end of play, the cords become a rough form of uri and later the uri is undone. This makes a part of Thiruvathira.

References

External links
Gurukripa Folk Arts Centre

See also
 Arts of Kerala

Dances of Kerala
Arts of Kerala